The Election Commission of Sri Lanka is the constitutional authority responsible for administering and overseeing all elections in Sri Lanka, including the Presidential, Parliamentary, Provincial and Local Authority elections. Sri Lanka has had universal adult suffrage since 1931, becoming the first Crown colony to enfranchise all adult citizens, 3 years after the United Kingdom itself; the country is the oldest democracy in Asia.

Early history
The recommendations of the Soulbury Commission of 1944 led to the country's 1948 'Soulbury Constitution', granting it independence with Dominion status within the British Empire through the Ceylon Independence Act of 1947. The work of the Commission began in 1944, with several pieces of key legislation being enacted in the interim as a result of its work- of these, the Ceylon (Constitution) Order in Council of 1946 would lead to the 1948 constitution, while the Ceylon (Parliamentary Elections) Order in Council and the Local Authorities Ordinance enacted in the same year created two government departments that would eventually go on to form the Elections Commission.

Section 88A of the Ceylon (Parliamentary Elections) Order in Council of 1946 established the Department of Parliamentary elections headed by a Commissioner and assisted by Assistant and Deputy Commissioners, with the responsibility of registering electors and the conduct of Parliamentary Elections. At the same time, the Local Authorities Ordinance, No. 53 of 1946 established the Department of Local Authorities Elections under a separate Commissioner and staff to oversee and administer all non-Parliamentary elections on the island. During its existence, the former oversaw two Parliamentary elections, in 1947 and 1952. These two departments functioned independently of each other until 1 October 1955, when they were merged to form the Department of Elections; as was the case with its predecessors, the department functioned as an independent, non-ministerial institution answerable only to Parliament and the Judiciary.

Commissioners

See also
Electoral districts of Sri Lanka
List of political parties in Sri Lanka

Notes

References

Elections in Sri Lanka
Sri Lanka